Fremont County is a county located in the U.S. state of Colorado. As of the 2020 census, the population was 48,939. The county seat is Cañon City. The county is named for 19th-century explorer and presidential candidate John C. Frémont.

Fremont County comprises the Cañon City, CO Micropolitan Statistical Area, which is also included in the Pueblo-Cañon City, CO Combined Statistical Area.

Rural Fremont County is the location of 15 prisons; most of these are operated by the state. ADX Florence, the only federal Supermax prison in the United States, is in an unincorporated area in Fremont County, south of Florence, and is part of the Federal Correctional Complex, Florence.  As of March 2015, Fremont County leads the nation among all counties as the one with the largest proportion of persons incarcerated. Prisoners are counted as part of the county population in the census, and 20% of residents are held in the prisons in the county.

History
Fremont County was founded in 1861, in central Colorado. It is named for John C. Frémont.

Geography

Adjacent counties
Teller County - north
El Paso County - northeast
Pueblo County - southeast
Custer County - south
Saguache County - southwest
Chaffee County - northwest
Park County - northwest

Major Highways
  U.S. Highway 50
  State Highway 9
  State Highway 67
  State Highway 69
  State Highway 96
  State Highway 115
  State Highway 120

National protected areas
Pike National Forest
San Isabel National Forest
Sangre de Cristo Wilderness

State protected area
Arkansas Headwaters Recreation Area

National scenic byway
Gold Belt Tour National Scenic and Historic Byway

Bicycle routes
American Discovery Trail
TransAmerica Trail Bicycle Route
Western Express Bicycle Route

Major highways
 U.S. Highway 50
 State Highway 9
 State Highway 67
 State Highway 115
 State Highway 120

Demographics

As of the census of 2000, there were 46,145 people, 15,232 households, and 10,494 families residing in the county.  The population density was 30 people per square mile (12/km2).  There were 17,145 housing units at an average density of 11 per square mile (4/km2).  The racial makeup of the county was 89.52% White, 5.34% Black or African American, 1.53% Native American, 0.50% Asian, 0.06% Pacific Islander, 1.22% from other races, and 1.82% from two or more races.  10.35% of the population were Hispanic or Latino of any race.

There were 15,232 households, out of which 30.00% had children under the age of 18 living with them, 56.30% were married couples living together, 9.20% had a female householder with no husband present, and 31.10% were non-families. 26.90% of all households were made up of individuals, and 12.50% had someone living alone who was 65 years of age or older.  The average household size was 2.43 and the average family size was 2.93.

In the county, the population was spread out, with 20.60% under the age of 18, 7.50% from 18 to 24, 33.40% from 25 to 44, 24.00% from 45 to 64, and 14.60% who were 65 years of age or older.  The median age was 39 years. For every 100 females there were 133.90 males.  For every 100 females age 18 and over, there were 143.50 males.

The median income for a household in the county was $34,150, and the median income for a family was $42,303. Males had a median income of $30,428 versus $23,112 for females. The per capita income for the county was $17,420.  About 8.30% of families and 11.70% of the population were below the poverty line, including 14.80% of those under age 18 and 7.40% of those age 65 or over.

Sister cities

  Kahoku, Yamagata Prefecture, Japan
  Valday, Russia

Government
Fremont County is governed by a board of county commissioners, one for each of the three separate districts in the county.
 Kevin Grantham, District 1
 Debbie Bell, District 2
 Dwayne McFall, District 3

The daily operations of the county are controlled centrally from the County Administration Building, located in Cañon City. It houses the offices of both elected and appointed officials, including:
 Stacey Seifert, assessor
 Justin D Grantham, clerk and recorder
 Randy Keller, coroner
 Kathy Elliott, treasurer/public trustee
 Allen Cooper, sheriff
 John Kratz, surveyor
 Sunny Bryant, county manager

Corrections and prisons
Colorado Department of Corrections operates several prisons in the county. The department operates the Colorado Territorial Correctional Facility in Cañon City. In addition several correctional facilities near Cañon City are located in unincorporated areas in the county. Colorado State Penitentiary, the location of the state death row and execution chamber, is in Fremont County. Other state prisons in Fremont County include Arrowhead Correctional Center, Centennial Correctional Facility, Fremont Correctional Facility, Four Mile Correctional Center, and Skyline Correctional Center.

The Colorado Women's Correctional Facility, near Cañon City in an unincorporated area, was decommissioned on June 4, 2009.

The Federal Bureau of Prisons operates the Federal Correctional Complex, Florence in Fremont County, which consists of several separate Federal prisons, including the only supermax facility in the federal system, home to many convicted terrorists and other notorious criminals.

Communities

Cities
 Cañon City (County seat)
 Florence

Towns

 Brookside
 Coal Creek
 Rockvale
 Williamsburg

Census-designated places
Coaldale
Cotopaxi
Howard
Lincoln Park
Park Center
Penrose

Other unincorporated communities
 Hillside
 Parkdale
 Portland
 Swissvale
 Texas Creek
 Wellsville

Ghost towns
 Adelaide
 Calcite
 Chandler
 Siloam
 Whitehorn
 Yorkville

See also

Outline of Colorado
Index of Colorado-related articles
Colorado census statistical areas
Front Range Urban Corridor
National Register of Historic Places listings in Fremont County, Colorado

References

External links
Fremont County Government website

Colorado County Evolution by Don Stanwyck

 

 
Colorado counties
1861 establishments in Colorado Territory
Populated places established in 1861